Andrenosoma is a genus of robber flies in the family Asilidae. There are at least 70 described species in Andrenosoma.

Species
These 77 species belong to the genus Andrenosoma:

 Andrenosoma acunai Bromley, 1929 c g
 Andrenosoma albibarbe (Meigen, 1820) c g
 Andrenosoma albolineatum (Macquart, 1850) c g
 Andrenosoma albopilosum Villeneuve, 1911 c g
 Andrenosoma appendiculatum (Macquart, 1846) c g
 Andrenosoma arachnoides (Bigot, 1878) c g
 Andrenosoma aricenniae Farr, 1965 c g
 Andrenosoma atrum (Linnaeus, 1758) c g
 Andrenosoma batesi Bromley, 1931 c g
 Andrenosoma bayardi Seguy, 1952 c g
 Andrenosoma biacuminaum García, Pérez & Portillo, 2017 g
 Andrenosoma boranicum Corti, 1895 c g
 Andrenosoma camposi Curran, 1931 c g
 Andrenosoma chalybeum Williston, 1885 c g
 Andrenosoma choprai Bromley, 1935 c g
 Andrenosoma cinctum (Bellardi, 1861) c
 Andrenosoma cinereum (Bellardi, 1861) c g
 Andrenosoma clauscicellum (Macquart, 1850) c g
 Andrenosoma complexum Oldroyd, 1970 c g
 Andrenosoma corallium Martin, 1966 i c g
 Andrenosoma cornutum Oldroyd, 1972 c g
 Andrenosoma crassum Bromley, 1929 c g
 Andrenosoma cruentum (Mc Atee, 1919) i c g
 Andrenosoma currani Bromley, 1931 c g
 Andrenosoma cyaniventre Bromley, 1934 c g
 Andrenosoma cyrtophora (Hermann, 1912) c g
 Andrenosoma cyrtoxys Seguy, 1952 c g
 Andrenosoma dayi (Paramonov, 1958) c g
 Andrenosoma elegans Bromley, 1934 c g
 Andrenosoma erax Bromley, 1934 c g
 Andrenosoma erythrogaster (Wiedemann, 1828) c g
 Andrenosoma erythropyga (Wiedemann, 1828) c g
 Andrenosoma flamipennis Bromley, 1931 c g
 Andrenosoma formidolosum (Walker, 1860) c g
 Andrenosoma fulvicaudum (Say, 1823) i c g b
 Andrenosoma funebris Artigas, Papavero & Pimentel, 1988 c g
 Andrenosoma heros Bromley, 1931 c g
 Andrenosoma hesperium Martin, 1966 i c g b
 Andrenosoma igneum Bromley, 1929 i c g b
 Andrenosoma irigense Oldroyd, 1972 c g
 Andrenosoma jenisi Kovar & Hradsky, 1996 c g
 Andrenosoma leucogenus Seguy, 1952 c g
 Andrenosoma lewisi Farr, 1965 c g
 Andrenosoma lupus Bromley, 1931 c g
 Andrenosoma mesoxanthum (Wiedemann, 1828) c g
 Andrenosoma minos Bromley, 1931 c g
 Andrenosoma modestum (Paramonov, 1958) c g
 Andrenosoma nigrum Bromley, 1931 c g
 Andrenosoma olbus (Walker, 1849) c g
 Andrenosoma phoenicogaster (Hermann, 1912) c g
 Andrenosoma punctatum Bromley, 1934 c g
 Andrenosoma purpurascens (Walker, 1856) c g
 Andrenosoma pusillum Hermann, 1906 c g
 Andrenosoma pygophora Schiner, 1868 c g
 Andrenosoma pyrrhopyga (Wiedemann, 1828) c g
 Andrenosoma quadrimaculatum Bromley, 1929 c g
 Andrenosoma queenslandi (Ricardo, 1918) c g
 Andrenosoma rubidum Williston, 1901 c g
 Andrenosoma rubidapex (Hermann, 1912) c g
 Andrenosoma rubidum (Williston, 1901) i
 Andrenosoma rufipenne (Wiedemann, 1828) c g
 Andrenosoma rufiventre (Blanchard, 1852) c g
 Andrenosoma rufum Bromley, 1931 c g
 Andrenosoma sarcophaga (Hermann, 1912) c g
 Andrenosoma serratum Hermann, 1906 c g
 Andrenosoma sexpunctatum (Williston, 1901) c g
 Andrenosoma sicarium (Mc Atee, 1919) i c g
 Andrenosoma subheros Bromley, 1931 c g
 Andrenosoma tectamum (Walker, 1849) c g
 Andrenosoma trigoniferum Hermann, 1906 c g
 Andrenosoma valentinae Richter, 1985 c g
 Andrenosoma varipes (Banks, 1920) c g
 Andrenosoma violaceum (Fabricius, 1781) c g
 Andrenosoma xanthocnema (Wiedemann, 1828) c g
 Andrenosoma zanutoi Artigas, Papavero & Pimentel, 1988 c g

Data sources: i = ITIS, c = Catalogue of Life, g = GBIF, b = Bugguide.net

References

Further reading

 
 
 

 
Asilidae genera
Articles created by Qbugbot
Taxa named by Camillo Rondani